Corymbia eremaea, commonly known as mallee bloodwood, hill bloodwood and centre range bloodwood, is a small, mallee-like tree that is endemic to central Australia. Indigenous Australians know the plant as muur-muurpa. It has rough, evenly tessellated bark, lance-shaped leaves, oval to pear-shaped flower buds arranged on a branching peduncle and urn-shaped fruit.

Description
It has rough, evenly-tessellated, brownish bark from the trunk to small branches, but sometimes only smooth bark on smaller plants. Flowering mainly occurs from November to January and the flowers are white. The seeds are brown with a terminal wing.

Taxonomy
Mallee bloodwood was first formally described in 1985 by Denis Carr and Stella Carr from specimens collected west of Ayers Rock in 1969 by John Maconochie, and was given the name Eucalyptus eremaea. In 1995 Ken Hill and Lawrie Johnson changed the name to Corymbia eremaea in the journal Telopea. The specific epithet (eremaea) refers to the occurrence of the species in desert areas.

In the same edition of Telopea, Hill and Johnson described two subspecies of C. eremaea and the names are accepted at the Australian Plant Census:

Distribution
Corymbea eremaea grows on stony hills, rocky slopes and the foot of rocky hills. Both subspecies are widespread and common in arid areas of central Australia, including the southern part of the Northern Territory as far east as the Simpson Desert, the north-western corner of South Australia and the Central Ranges of Western Australia.

Conservation status
Both subspecies of C. eremaea are listed as "not threatened" by the Western Australian Government Department of Parks and Wildlife and as of "least concern" under the Northern Territory Territory Parks and Wildlife Conservation Act 1976.

See also
 List of Corymbia species

References

eremaea
Myrtales of Australia
Flora of Western Australia
Flora of South Australia
Flora of the Northern Territory
Taxa named by Maisie Carr
Plants described in 1985